Norwegian Postal Codes are four-digit codes, known in Norwegian as  (literally 'post number'). Posten, the Norwegian postal service, makes small modifications to the postal code system each year. In 1999 Posten made considerable changes to the postal codes in Norway.

Since 18 March 1968 Norway has used a four-digit system: . The numbers start at 00 and increase with the distance from the capital city Oslo. The highest post numbers are found in the county of Finnmark, near the Russian border, where they start with 95–99. The lowest post code in use is 0001 (Oslo), the highest 9991 (Båtsfjord).

Postal number regions 
The first two numbers indicate the geographic location (counties) the postal code belongs to.

 00 to 12 Oslo
 13 to 14 Akershus
 15 to 18 Østfold
 19 to 21 Akershus
 21 to 25 Hedmark
 26 to 29 Oppland
 30  Buskerud
 30–32 Vestfold
 33–36 Buskerud
 36–39 Telemark
 40–44 Rogaland
 44–47 Vest-Agder
 47–49 Aust-Agder
 50–55 Hordaland
 55 Rogaland
 56–57 Hordaland
 57 Sogn og Fjordane
 58–59 Hordaland
 59 Sogn og Fjordane
 60–66 Møre og Romsdal
 67–69 Sogn og Fjordane
 70–79 Trøndelag
 79–89 Nordland
 84 Nordland and Troms
 8099  Jan Mayen
 90–94 Troms
 917  Svalbard
 94 Nordland and Troms
 95–99 Finnmark

External links
Posten – The Norwegian Postal Service

Norway
Postal codes
Postal system of Norway